Jack Buckley (25 June 1907 – 26 April 1980) was an Australian rules footballer who played with Fitzroy in the Victorian Football League (VFL).

He was the father of Carlton footballer, Brian Buckley, and Coburg footballer, John Buckley, and the grandfather of Carlton footballers Stephen Buckley and Mark Buckley.

Notes

External links 

1907 births
1980 deaths
Australian rules footballers from Victoria (Australia)
Fitzroy Football Club players